Touhami Zoubir Khelifi Stadium, is a multi-use stadium in Aïn M'lila, Algeria. The stadium holds 8,000 people. It serves as a home ground for AS Aïn M'lila which plays in Algerian Ligue Professionnelle 1. It replaced the older Stade des Frères Demane-Debbih which no longer meets the requirements for a Ligue 1 team after their promotion. The stadium is named after cyclist Khelifi Touhami Zoubir who was a member of the sports club's cycling team. It has a natural grass surface instead of an artificial one of the previous stadium. It also has a running track. The first home match on the ground was played on 19 January 2019 against O Médéa.

References

Football venues in Algeria
Multi-purpose stadiums in Algeria
Buildings and structures in Oum El Bouaghi Province
AS Aïn M'lila